Sick, Sick, Sick is a 2019 Brazilian drama film directed by Alice Furtado. It was screened in the Directors' Fortnight section at the 2019 Cannes Film Festival.

Cast
 Digão Ribeiro
 Juan Paiva
 Lourenço Mutarelli
 Luiza Kosovski
 Nahuel Perez Biscayart
 Silvia Buarque

References

External links
 

2019 films
2019 drama films
Brazilian drama films
2010s Portuguese-language films